The High Rocky Point is a coastal landmark, located on the south western coast of Tasmania, Australia. The Wanderer River is located to the north of the point.

It is in an isolated and generally inaccessible area, however at different times mineral finds have occurred nearby. The point is a location on the west coast walking track between Cape Sorell and Port Davey, with High Rocky Point being in an area of thick almost impassable scrub.

The area surrounding the point has recorded former aboriginal sites of historical significance.

The name is closely related to Rocky Point and Low Rocky Point, creating some historical confusion.

See also

Geology of Tasmania

References

South West coast of Tasmania
Headlands of Tasmania